9 Cephei (9 Cep), also known as V337 Cephei, is a variable star in the constellation Cepheus.

9 Cephei was given the name V337 Cephei and classified as an α Cygni variable in 1967.  It varies irregularly between magnitude 4.69 and 4.78.  A study of the Hipparcos satellite photometry showed an amplitude of 0.56 magnitudes, but could find no periodicity.

9 Cephei is considered to be a member of the Cepheus OB2 stellar association, a scattering of massive bright stars around a thousand parsecs away in the southern part of the constellation Cepheus.

Calculations of the physical properties of 9 Cephei vary considerably even from broadly similar observational data.

References

Cepheus (constellation)
B-type supergiants
Cephei, 09
Alpha Cygni variables
106801
Cepheus, V337
8279
206165
BD+61 2169
J21375521+6204548
IRAS catalogue objects